Lucie Marie Bréard (later Jurion, 12 September 1902 – 26 June 1988) was a French middle-distance runner. She competed at the 1921 and 1922 Women's World Games and won the gold medals in the 800 m (1921) and 1000 m events (1922, setting a new world record). She was the French cross-country champion in 1920 and 1921.

Her main competitors were French Marcelle Neveu (of club UA St. Cloud, who held the world record of 1000 m in 1921 and European 800m record in 1922, and was France champion cross country in 1922, 1923 and 1924), and Georgette Lenoir (holder of the world record of 1 000 m in 1922). Previously, French Lucie Cadiès - also running for club Femina Sport - in 1918 and in 1919 Suzanne Guery had held the world record of 1000 m).

La Vie au Grand Air edition of 13 September 1921 devoted a full story to Lucie Breard and the magazine Spiridon October–November 1983 also wrote of her.  She married in 1924.

Prize List 

 World Record Holder at 800 m in 1921 running 2 min 30 s 2
 World Record Holder at 1000 m in 1920, 1921 and 1922 running 3 min 12 s 2
 Holder of European Record at 800 m in 1920
  Gold Medal at 800 m at the 1st meeting of International féminin in 1921, at Monte-Carlo (other champions from Fémina Sport club, who were winners in 1921 : Violette Morris, in Shot Put and Javelin, Germaine Delapierre at the 100 yards hurdles (74 m Hurdles) and Frédérique Kussel in the High Jump — see Miroir des Sports of 14/04/1921) 
  Gold Medal at the 1 000 m at the first Jeux mondiaux féminins (called the Olympic Championships) in 1922 (sole French winner), at Paris (2nd Georgette Lenoir)
  French Cross Country Championships in 1920 and 1921
  Champion of France at middle-distance (800 m - 1 500 m).

References

1902 births
1988 deaths
French female middle-distance runners
Women's World Games medalists
20th-century French women